The Broken Glass Theory is a 2021 Uruguayan comedy film directed by Diego Fernández. It was selected as the Uruguayan entry for the Best International Feature Film at the 94th Academy Awards.

Plot
Claudio, an insurance expert, investigates a series of car fires in a small town.

Cast
 Jorge Temponi
 Carlos Frasca
 Martín Slipak
 Guillermo Arengo

See also
 List of submissions to the 94th Academy Awards for Best International Feature Film
 List of Uruguayan submissions for the Academy Award for Best International Feature Film

References

External links
 

2021 films
2021 comedy films
Uruguayan comedy films
2020s Spanish-language films